Kessler's Cross Lanes (sometimes misspelled as Kesler's Cross Lanes on maps) is an unincorporated community along Route 129 in Nicholas County, West Virginia, United States. Just south of Kessler's Cross Lanes is Carnifex Ferry Battlefield State Park, which is a park of historical interest; a Civil War battle was fought at the site in 1863.

Located nearby is the Capt. John Halstead Farm, listed on the National Register of Historic Places in 1998.

Name
The community was named after Frederick Kessler, an early settler.

See also
Battle of Kessler's Cross Lanes

References

Unincorporated communities in West Virginia
Unincorporated communities in Nicholas County, West Virginia